Withypoll may refer to:

John Withypoll (c. 1483–15??), English politician
Paul Withypoll, (c.1485–1547), English merchant and politician
Elizabeth Withypoll (1510–1537), English calligrapher, daughter of Paul Withypoll
Edmund Withypoll (c.1510–1583), English politician, son of Paul Withypoll

See also
Withypool